John Hamid Larbi (born 5 March 1977 in Göteborg, Västra Götaland) is a boxer from Sweden, who won the bronze medal in the Men's Bantamweight (– 54 kg) division at the 1996 European Amateur Boxing Championships in Vejle, Denmark.

Larbi represented his native country at the 1996 Summer Olympics in Atlanta, Georgia. There he was stopped in the first round of the Men's Bantamweight division by Cuba's eventual silver medalist Arnaldo Mesa.

References

1974 births
Living people
Bantamweight boxers
Boxers at the 1996 Summer Olympics
Olympic boxers of Sweden
Sportspeople from Gothenburg
Swedish male boxers
20th-century Swedish people